The Islanders is a 2011 science fiction novel by British writer Christopher Priest.

Plot summary
The Islanders is written as a guidebook to a series of fictional islands, using the literary device of an unreliable narrator. As it portrays and describes a number of the exotic islands, the specific details shift as the story is told, including the names and locations. There are islands that have been sculpted into vast musical instruments, others are home to lethal creatures, others the playground for high society. 

The story is set in the same world as Priest's 1981 novel The Affirmation, as well as his short story collection The Dream Archipelago (1999). The stories all share in common their use of an unreliable narrator.

Critical reception 
Publishers Weekly wrote: "British novelist Priest (The Prestige) creates a mind-bending, head-scratching book (already much lauded in the U.K.) that pretends to be a gazetteer of the Dream Archipelago, uncountable islands spread around a world whose temporal and spatial anomalies make such a project futile. The dispassionate descriptions of separate islands include odd references out of which it's possible to begin assembling a cast of characters: maniac artists, social reformers, murderers, scientific researchers, and passionate lovers. Some of these categories overlap, and all the actors are maddeningly fragmented, apt to fade away or flash intensely to life. Interpolated bits of directly personal narratives sometimes clarify and sometimes muddy the story (or stories), while uncanny events struggle to escape the gazetteers' avowedly objective control and Priest's elegant, cool prose. The result is wonderfully fascinating, if occasionally frustrating, and entirely unforgettable." The Guardian wrote "The trip Christopher Priest takes us on in The Islanders is not such an easy-going one. Descriptions of the islands are often of the prevailing climate, currents, winds and other technical information. ... Still, piecing together the rather unpleasant lives of the main characters is entertaining; and there are episodes complete in themselves, short stories really, which are satisfying."

Awards 
The Islanders won the 2011 BSFA Award for Best Novel and in 2012 came joint first (with Joan Slonczewski) in the John W. Campbell Memorial Award for Best Science Fiction Novel.

References

External links 
 Christopher Priest's Website

2011 British novels
2011 science fiction novels
British science fiction novels
Fiction about immortality
Fiction with unreliable narrators
John W. Campbell Award for Best Science Fiction Novel-winning works
Novels by Christopher Priest
Novels set on islands
Victor Gollancz Ltd books